Fatoumata Dembele (born 28 November 1990) is a Malian footballer who plays as a defender for USFAS and the Mali women's national team.

International career
Dembele capped for Mali at senior level during the 2014 Africa Women Cup of Nations qualification.

References

1990 births
Living people
Malian women's footballers
Mali women's international footballers
Women's association football defenders
21st-century Malian people